Antoine Duprat (17 January 1463 – 1535) was a French Cardinal and politician, who was chancellor of France.

Life
Duprat was born in Issoire in Auvergne. Educated for the law, he won a high position in his profession and in 1507 became first president of the Parlement of Paris (the highest court of France). In 1515 Francis I of France made him chancellor of France and prime minister.

In 1517, after his wife's death, he took holy orders and gradually rose in the Catholic Church hierarchy: first as bishop of several dioceses held by him in plurality; then as Archbishop of Sens, 1525; cardinal, 1527, and legate a latere, 1530. Duprat's influence extended much beyond the departments of justice and finance placed under his direct control. French historian Gabriel Hanotaux, in the introduction to his Recueil des instructions, calls Duprat 

This influence was constantly exerted to strengthen royal absolute power; it was felt in the measures he took against the grands Seigneurs and in his elaborate fiscal system.

Duprat left no writings, but took a leading part in the compilation of the "Coutumes d'Auvergne"; he also did much to encourage the renaissance of letters.

Churchman

Duprat's influence was also manifested, together with his orthodoxy, in those measures which affected the relations of France with the Church, namely, the signing of the Concordat of Bologna, and the checking of nascent Protestantism. The Concordat, which Duprat himself negotiated with Pope Leo X at Bologna, did away with the principles of the "Pragmatic Sanction"; on the other hand, by causing the appointment of the French hierarchy to rest on royal nomination instead of the old canonical elections, it vested in the civil power an authority over Church affairs.

Duprat's uncompromising attitude towards Protestantism was dictated both by his political sense, as well as his Catholic orthodoxy. The Protestant sympathies of Marguerite d'Angouleme, the Duchesse d'Etampes, and the Minister du Bellay failed to move him. The Sorbonne and the Parlement were instructed to exclude the writings of the innovators; in 1534 the posting of subversive pamphlets at the door of the royal apartments cost the perpetrators their lives.

Despite being archbishop of Sens for several years, the first time he entered the cathedral there was for his own funeral. This shows how he abstained from some of his responsibilities, thus leading us to acknowledge clerical ignorance and absenteeism of the time.

References

External links
Catholic Encyclopedia article
Biography

1463 births
1535 deaths
People from Issoire
16th-century French cardinals
Bishops of Albi
Bishops of Meaux
Archbishops of Sens
Bishops of Valence